Thondamuthur is a suburb of Coimbatore city in the Indian state of Tamil Nadu. It comes under the Coimbatore Corporation. Thondamuthur is located 15 km west from the District headquarters Coimbatore, there are three routes available to reach Thondamuthur, through Vadavalli (15 km), through Perur (15 km), through Gandhi park, Vedapatti (14 km). Thondamuthur is the residential area. There is very high rise in population due to the development of many residential plots, apartments and many people reside here because the place is well connected with city centre through many routes and they can easily commute daily from Thondamuthur. The climate of Thondamuthur is very pleasant, low pollution, and many tourist spots like kovai Kutralam , Velliangiri hills, Isha Foundation, Siruvani hills, Vaidehi falls are situated near Thondamuthur. People can taste World's second tastiest water Siruvani here.

Demographics 
 India census, Thondamuthur had a population of 8,386.  And as of 2009 is on the rise.  Males constitute 52% of the population and females 48%.  Thondamuthur has an average literacy rate of 68%, higher than the national average of 59.5%, male literacy is 79%, and female literacy is 56%. In Thondamuthur 15% of the population are under 6 years of age.

Thondamuthur Panchayat union

Thondamuthur is head of Thondamuthur Panchayat union there are 10 village Panchayats are included in the Union.

Devarayapuram
Ikkaraibooluvampatti
Jagirnaickenpalyam
Madampatti
Madavarayapuram
Narasipuram
Perur Chettipalayam

Theethipalayam
Thennammanallur
Vellimalaipattinam

Politics 
Thondamuthur assembly constituency is a part of Pollachi (Lok Sabha constituency).

Location 
Thondamuthur is located on Boluvampatti Road, Coimbatore.  The nearby neighbourhoods are Muthipalayam,Kembanur,
Kuppepalayam,Attukal,
Thennamanalur, Uliyampalayam, Vedapatti,Sundapalayam, Devarayapuram, Viraliyur, Mathampatti,Narasipuram, and Alandurai, kondayampalayam.

Economy 
Thondamuthur's economy is on the rise owing to its proximity to Coimbatore.  It is one of the fast developing neighborhoods in the Coimbatore area.  There has been a recent spurt in housing complexes and premium old age homes in and around this location.

See also
Pollachi
Coimbatore
Perur
Madukkarai

References 

Cities and towns in Coimbatore district
Suburbs of Coimbatore